The 1947–48 BAA season was the Bullets' first season in the Basketball Association of America (later named the NBA), after playing their first three seasons in the American Basketball League.

Draft picks

Roster

Regular season

Season standings

Record vs. opponents

Game log

a: Game Played at Fifth Regiment Armory

Playoffs

Western Division tiebreaker
Chicago Stags vs. Baltimore Bullets: Bullets win series 1-0
Game 1 @ Chicago (March 25): Baltimore 75, Chicago 72

First round
(W2) Baltimore Bullets vs. (E2) New York Knicks: Bullets win series 2-1
Game 1 @ Baltimore (March 27): Baltimore 85, New York 81
Game 2 @ New York (March 28): New York 79, Baltimore 69
Game 3 @ Baltimore (April 1): Baltimore 84, New York 77

Semifinals
(W2) Baltimore Bullets vs. (W3) Chicago Stags: Bullets win series 2-0
Game 1 @ Chicago (April 7): Baltimore 73, Chicago 67
Game 2 @ Baltimore (April 8): Baltimore 89, Chicago 72

BAA Finals

(E1) Philadelphia Warriors vs. (W2) Baltimore Bullets: Bullets win series 4-2
Game 1 @ Philadelphia (April 10): Philadelphia 71, Baltimore 60
Game 2 @ Philadelphia (April 13): Baltimore 66, Philadelphia 63
Game 3 @ Baltimore (April 15): Baltimore 72, Philadelphia 70
Game 4 @ Baltimore (April 17): Baltimore 78, Philadelphia 75
Game 5 @ Philadelphia (April 20): Philadelphia 91, Baltimore 82
Game 6 @ Baltimore (April 21): Baltimore 88, Philadelphia 73

Transactions

Trades

Purchases

References

Baltimore Bullets (1944–1954) seasons
Baltimore
NBA championship seasons